364th may refer to:

364th Bombardment Squadron, inactive United States Air Force unit
364th Fighter Group or 131st Bomb Wing, unit of the Missouri Air National Guard, stationed at Whiteman Air Force Base, Knob Noster, Missouri
364th Fighter Squadron, established at Hamilton Field, California in December 1942, part of the 357th Fighter Group

See also
364 (number)
364, the year 364 (CCCLXIV) of the Julian calendar
364 BC